Dr Joseph Mamboah Rockson is a Ghanaian politician and a member of the National Democratic Congress of Ghana.

Political life
Dr. Rockson twice contested the Nkwanta North constituency in northern part Volta Region but lost on both times. He contested the  Member of Parliament (MP) for the Bimbilla constituency in the Northern Region of Ghana in 2016 and lost to the incumbent Dominic Nitiwul.

References

Year of birth missing (living people)
Living people
National Democratic Congress (Ghana) politicians
Northern Region (Ghana)